Joe Gonzales (born April 10, 1957) is an American wrestler. He competed in the men's freestyle 52 kg at the 1984 Summer Olympics.

References

1957 births
Living people
American male sport wrestlers
Olympic wrestlers of the United States
Wrestlers at the 1984 Summer Olympics
Sportspeople from Montebello, California